Brad Williams (born October 8, 1956) is an American man from Prairie du Chien, Wisconsin who is considered by scientists to have one of the best memories in the world and one of the only twenty-five people in the world who has been confirmed by researchers as having a condition called hyperthymestic syndrome. He can remember almost every day of his life, easily naming the day of the week, date, month, and year of innumerable personal and public events.

Williams is the author of the Triviazoids, a daily blog showing unusual connections in history for that particular date. He is the subject of the documentary Unforgettable (2010) by his brother Eric Williams (Mad City) and of a part of the episode Super Special of Stan Lee's Superhumans.

See also
 USA Memory Championship
Solomon Shereshevsky

References

External links
Triviazoids — A Day-By-Day Look At History's Links
Unforgettable (2010) trailer

Living people
American mnemonists
People from Prairie du Chien, Wisconsin
1956 births